Turks in Mexico comprise Turkish people living in Mexico and their Mexico-born descendants. The Turkish community is largely made up of immigrants or the descendants of immigrants, born in the Ottoman Empire before 1923, in the Republic of Turkey since then or in neighbouring countries once part of the Ottoman Empire that still have some Turkish population.

History
According to census records, "Turks" have been present in Mexico since at least 1895 with 453 individuals recorded. However, most of the emigres from the Ottoman Empire were not ethnic Turks. Since they traveled with passports issued by Turkish authorities, it led to a misunderstanding in Latin America of identifying Arab immigrants as "turcos" (Turks).

Institutions
 Casa Turca Ciudad de México (2003) and Casa Turca Guadalajara (2015)

See also

 Mexico–Turkey relations

Further reading
 Alfaro-Velcamp, Theresa, So Far from Allah, So Close to Mexico: Middle Eastern Immigrants in Modern Mexico, University of Texas Press, 2009

References

Mexico
Ethnic groups in Mexico
Turkish diaspora in North America
Islam in Mexico